Magaldrate (INN) is a common antacid drug that is used for the treatment of duodenal and gastric ulcers, esophagitis from gastroesophageal reflux.

Development

Magaldrat was first synthesized by the German chemist Gunther Hallmann and patented on February 2, 1960, by Byk Gulden Lomberg Chemische Fabrik (Germany). In 1983, the active substance was registered as the original drug Riopan.

Available forms 
Magaldrate is available in the form of oral suspension or tablets.

Pharmacology 
Magaldrate is a hydroxymagnesium aluminate complex that is converted rapidly by gastric acid into Mg(OH)2 and Al(OH)3, which are absorbed poorly and thus provide a sustained antacid effect.

Interactions and adverse reactions 
Magaldrate may negatively influence drugs like tetracyclines, benzodiazepines, and indomethacin. High doses or prolonged usage may lead to an increment of defecation and a reduction in feces consistence. In some cases it can alter the functionality of the gastrointestinal tract, occasionally provoking constipation or diarrhea.

References

Aluminates
Magnesium compounds
Antacids